Alvite may refer to:

 Alvite (Cabeceiras de Basto), a civil parish in the municipality of Cabeceiras de Basto
 Alvite (mineral), a mineral [(Hf, Th, Zr)SiO4·H2O]
 Alvite (Moimenta da Beira), a parish in the municipality of Moimenta da Beira